The AeroPress is a manual coffeemaker invented by Alan Adler, founder of AeroPress, Inc. It consists of a cylindrical chamber, and a plunger with an airtight silicone seal, similar to a syringe. Ground coffee beans and water are steeped inside, then forced through a filter by pressing the plunger through the chamber. It is capable of brewing highly concentrated coffee, which the manufacturer describes as "espresso style", but can also be used to brew filter strength coffee, or cold brew coffee.

History and design 

The AeroPress was invented by retired Stanford engineering lecturer Alan Adler. Adler began developing the brewer in 2004, with the intention of reducing acidity and bitterness in his daily cup of coffee. Adler had tried brewing with an espresso machine, pour-over brewer, and french press, but expressed dissatisfaction with each brewer's limited control over parameters such as brew time, water temperature, and grind size. He first began prototyping the AeroPress in his garage.

The brewer consists of a translucent cylindrical chamber, and a plunger with an airtight silicone seal, similar to a syringe. A filter cap is screwed onto the end, to hold a small round paper filter in place. It comes bundled with several accessories, including a scoop and funnel for loading ground coffee, a stirring paddle, a tote bag, and a plastic holder for storing filter papers. Metal filters are available, but Aeropress do not supply them, finding that coffee made with paper filters is better.

The chamber and plunger are moulded out of translucent plastic, tinted a grey colour. Early AeroPress models used polycarbonate, but in 2009 switched to BPA-free copolyester, then in 2014 to polypropylene. The company claims that in lab testing, no BPA leached from these early models into brewed coffee. The lettering changed color several times, but the brewer's design was otherwise unchanged between these versions.

In 2019, AeroPress, Inc. released the AeroPress Go, a travel-sized model with a reduced chamber capacity, smaller accessories, and an included travel cup.

Reception

Release 
The device was officially unveiled in November 2005, at the CoffeeFest trade show in Seattle. In the years after its release, it gained a cult following among coffee enthusiasts, who praised it for its flexibility and consistency in brewing.

World AeroPress Championship 
The World AeroPress Championship is an international fan-led AeroPress brewing competition. The event is a multi-round, elimination tournament, in which competitors have five minutes to brew coffee. It was first held in Oslo, Norway, in 2008, with only three competitors, but grew in popularity each year after. The 2018 competition attracted 3,157 competitors from 61 countries. The 2020 championship was cancelled due to the COVID-19 pandemic. The championship resumed in 2021, with both in-person events and a new online format, in which competitors create and submit their recipe remotely.

Operation

Traditional

According to the instructions, fine-ground coffee is placed in the bottom of the larger cylinder on top of a paper microfilter.

Inverted
Baristas and coffee drinkers have also developed methods of brewing using the AeroPress with an inverted brewing technique.

In inverted brewing, the plunger is placed into the column from the beginning, close to the "top" of the column, and the entire AeroPress stands upside-down, resting on the top of the plunger. One or two scoops of ground coffee are added, followed by water, and the entire mixture then stirred. While that brews, a filter is placed into the filter cap and moistened to help it stick in place then the AeroPress cap is placed on top of the column and screwed into place. Lastly, once the desired brewing time is complete the AeroPress is either turned right-side-up and plunged normally or held at an angle and plunged horizontally.

This method is more similar to the French press, particularly the extended brewing time in which the grounds and water sit together. This makes it useful for using grinds that wouldn't be optimal in the official method such as coarse grinds that might be used in a French press.

Traditional method coffee properties 

 Claimed to have roughly the same concentration as espresso
 Higher pH (thus lower acidity) than drip coffee
 30-second total brewing time

Contrasts with other immersion brewing methods 
The AeroPress uses finely ground bean, has a short brewing time of 30 seconds and, similar to espresso, uses pressure to extract flavor.  French press (cafetière) uses a much coarser grind and has a much longer brewing time of 4–5 minutes; it uses a metal filter and the coffee is brewed without pressure.  Siphon brew uses intermediate fine grinds and has a 90-second brewing time, using a cloth filter without pressure.  Espresso runs high temperature water at very high pressure through very finely ground coffee.  Unlike the AeroPress the water is forced through mechanically, rather than by the user pressing a plunger.  

Third-party reusable metal mesh filters are available for the AeroPress, but AeroPress does not recommend them, saying that coffee made with paper filters has tested better for taste.

Notes

References

External links
 
 World Aeropress Championship website
 AeroPrecipe – Database of AeroPress recipes

Coffee preparation
American brands
American inventions
Products introduced in 2005
Coffee appliance vendors